Egon Schnabel (born 19 May 1937) is a German biathlete. He competed in the 20 km individual event at the 1964 Winter Olympics.

References

External links
 

1937 births
Living people
German male biathletes
Olympic biathletes of the United Team of Germany
Biathletes at the 1964 Winter Olympics
People from Gotha (district)
Sportspeople from Thuringia